Harold Parker was a sculptor.

Harold Parker may also refer to:

Harold Parker (footballer)
Harold Parker State Forest

See also
Harry Parker (disambiguation)